The Battle of Grotniki took place on 4 May 1439 in the vicinity of Grotniki Duże, a village near Nowy Korczyn, currently in Świętokrzyskie Voivodeship. 

The battle was fought between the Hussite confederates under Spytko III of Melsztyn against the royal forces of King Władysław III of Poland under Hińcza of Rogów and  de facto regent bishop Zbigniew Oleśnicki. The defeat of the non-Catholic forces marked the end of militant Hussite movement in Poland and the beginning of a complete consolidation of power in the Polish Kingdom, led by bishop Zbigniew.

Bibliography
Jan Długosz, Annales seu Cronicae incliti regni Poloniae, opera venerabili domini Ioanni Dlugossi, liber XI i XII, Warsaw 2001, page 202 - 206.
Secondary sources
Anna Sochacka "Konfederacja Spytka z Melsztyna z 1439r. Rozgrywka polityczna, czy ruch ideologiczny? "  Rocznik Lubelski, vol XVI, Lublin 1973.

1439 in Europe
Grotniki 1439
Grotniki 1439
Grotniki
15th century in Poland
History of Świętokrzyskie Voivodeship